The 2015–16 Sydney Blue Sox season was the team's sixth season. The Blue Sox competed in the Australian Baseball League (ABL) with five other teams, playing its home games at Blacktown International Sportspark Sydney.

Offseason

Regular season

Standings

Record vs opponents

Game log 

|-bgcolor=#ffbbbb
| 1
| 23 October
| @  (DH 1)
| 0-3
| M. Larkins
| W. Lundgren
| W. Wu
| 0-1
| 
|-bgcolor=#bbffbb
| 2
| 24 October
| @  (DH 1)
| 7-3
| B. Zywicki
| J. Kennedy
| -
| 1-1
| 
|-bgcolor=#ffbbbb
| 3
| 24 October
| @  (DH 2)
| 2-4
| Y. Sano
| C. Letourneau
| T. Yamaguchi
| 1-2
| 
|-bgcolor=#bbffbb
| 4
| 25 October
| @ 
| 6-4
| T. Grattan
| M. Wilson
| -
| 2-2
| 
|-bgcolor=#ffbbbb
| 5
| 30 October
| 
| 1-4
| D. Schmidt
| W. Lundgren
| M. Taylor
| 2-3
| 
|-bgcolor=#bbffbb
| 6
| 31 October
|  (DH 1)
| 6-1
| A. Balog
| J. Jones
| -
| 3-3
| 
|-bgcolor=#bbffbb
| 7
| 31 October
|  (DH 2)
| 3-2
| C. Drummond
| S. Mitchinson
| -
| 4-3
| 
|-

|-bgcolor=#ffbbbb
| 8
| 1 November
| 
| 3-5
| E. Valle
| G. Lim
| -
| 4-4
| 
|-bgcolor=#bbbbbb
| 9
| 5 November
| @ 
| PPD - RAIN
| -
| -
| -
| -
| 
|-bgcolor=#ffbbbb
| 10
| 6 November
| @  
| 0-9
| B. Grening
| W. Lundgren
| -
| 4-5
| 
|-bgcolor=#bbffbb
| 11
| 7 November
| @  (DH 1)
| 6-0
| A. Balog
| W. Korpi
| -
| 5-5
| 
|-bgcolor=#ffbbbb
| 12
| 7 November
| @  (DH 2)
| 3-14
| S. Kent
| C. Anderson
| -
| 5-6
| 
|-bgcolor=#ffbbbb
| 13
| 8 November
| @ 
| 11-10
| M. Click
| C. Drummond
| -
| 5-7
| 
|-bgcolor=#bbbbbb
| 14
| 12 November
| 
| PPD - RAIN
| -
| -
| -
| -
| 
|-bgcolor=#bbbbbb
| 15
| 13 November
| 
| PPD - RAIN
| -
| -
| -
| -
| 
|-bgcolor=#bbbbbb
| 16
| 14 November
|  (DH 1)
| PPD - RAIN
| -
| -
| -
| -
| 
|-bgcolor=#bbbbbb
| 17
| 14 November
|  (DH 2)
| PPD - RAIN
| -
| -
| -
| -
| 
|-bgcolor=#ffbbbb
| 18
| 15 November
|  (DH 1)
| 3-6
| S. Chambers
| A. Balog
| K. Kerski
| 5-8
| 
|-bgcolor=#ffbbbb
| 19
| 15 November
|  (DH 2)
| 0-4
| N. Talbot
| W. Lundgren
| -
| 5-9
| 
|-bgcolor=#bbffbb
| 20
| 20 November
| @ 
| 7-4
| A. Balog
| D. Schmidt
| C. Drummond
| 6-9
| 
|-bgcolor=#ffbbbb
| 21
| 21 November
| @  (DH 1)
| 1-2
| T. Bailey
| M. Rae
| -
| 6-10
| 
|-bgcolor=#bbffbb
| 22
| 21 November
| @  (DH 2)
| 5-4
| C. Anderson
| J. Jones
| C. Drummond
| 7-10
| 
|-bgcolor=#ffbbbb 
| 23
| 22 November
| @ 
| 5-10 
| N. Veale
| J. Stoecklin
| -
| 7-11
| 
|-bgcolor=#bbffbb
| 24
| 26 November
| 
| 5-1
| A. Balog
| R. Teasley
| -
| 8-11
| 
|-bgcolor=#bbffbb
| 25
| 27 November
| 
| 8-5
| W. Lundgren
| J. Jarvis
| C. Drummond
| 9-11
| 
|-bgcolor=#bbffbb
| 26
| 28 November
| 
| 5-1
| C. Anderson
| T. Baker
| L. Wilkins
| 10-11
| 
|-bgcolor=#bbffbb
| 27
| 29 November
| 
| 6-2
| J. Stoecklin
| J. Erasmus
| -
| 11-11
| 
|-

|-bgcolor=#ffbbbb 
| 28
| 3 December
| @ 
| 0-4
| S. Chambers
| A. Balog
| -
| 11-12
| 
|-bgcolor=#ffbbbb
| 29
| 4 December
| @ 
| 3-6
| H. Lee
| M. Rae
| L. Van Mil
| 11-13
| 
|-bgcolor=#ffbbbb
| 30
| 5 December
| @  (DH 1)
| 3-4
| J. Tols
| L. Wilkins
| K. Kerski
| 11-14
| 
|-bgcolor=#ffbbbb 
| 31
| 5 December
| @  (DH 2)
| 11-13
| C. Dula
| G. Lim
| L. Van Mil
| 11-15
| 
|-bgcolor=#bbffbb
| 32
| 6 December
| @ 
| 14-9
| J. Stoecklin
| W. Lee
| -
| 12-15
| 
|-bgcolor=#bbffbb
| 33
| 11 December
| 
| 8-0
| A. Balog
| B. Grening
| -
| 13-15
| 
|-bgcolor=#bbffbb
| 34
| 12 December
| 
| 11-7
| L. Wilkins
| W. Korpi
| -
| 14-15
| 
|-bgcolor=#bbffbb
| 35
| 13 December
| 
| 6-1
| C. Anderson
| S. Kent
| -
| 15-15
| 
|-bgcolor=#bbffbb
| 36
| 14 December
| 
| 8-2
| J. Stoecklin
| S. Cone
| -
| 16-15
| 
|-bgcolor=#bbffbb
| 37
| 18 December
| 
| 5-3
| M. Rae
| J. Kennedy
| C. Drummond
| 17-15
| 
|-bgcolor=#bbffbb
| 38
| 19 December
|  (DH 1)
| 5-0
| C. Anderson
| Y. Sano
| -
| 18-15
| 
|-bgcolor=#ffbbbb
| 39
| 19 December
|  (DH 2)
| 3-7
| M. Larkins
| J. Stoecklin
| -
| 18-16
| 
|-bgcolor=#bbffbb
| 40
| 20 December
| 
| 5-3
| W. Lundgren
| M. McGillivray
| C. Drummond
| 19-16
| 
|-bgcolor=#ffbbbb
| 41
| 26 December
| @ 
| 5-7
| J. Jarvis
| C. Anderson
| R. Searle
| 19-17
| 
|-bgcolor=#ffbbbb
| 42
| 27 December
| @ 
| 2-10
| J. Erasmus
| W. Lundgren
| 
| 
| 
|-bgcolor=#ffbbbb
| 43
| 28 December
| @ 
| 0-3
| R. Teasley
| L. Wells
| R. Searle
| 19-19
| 
|-bgcolor=#ffbbbb
| 44
| 29 December
| @ 
| 9-11
| T. Stanton
| A. Sookee
| R. Searle
| 19-20
| 
|-bgcolor=#ffbbbb
| 45
| 31 December
| 
| 3-8
| S. Chambers
| M. Rae
| -
| 19-21
| 
|-

|-bgcolor=#ffbbbb 
| 46
| 1 January
| 
| 1-7
| J. Tols
| C. Anderson
| -
| 19-22
| 
|-bgcolor=#bbffbb
| 47
| 2 January
|  (DH 1)
| 7-6
| A. Sookee
| L. Van Mil
| T. Van Steensel
| 20-22
| 
|-bgcolor=#bbffbb
| 48
| 2 January
|  (DH 2)
| 9-2
| W. Lundgren
| D. Gallant
| -
| 21-22
| 
|-bgcolor=#bbffbb
| 49
| 3 January
| 
| 7-0
| J. Stoecklin
| M. Williams
| -
| 22-22
| 
|-bgcolor=#bbffbb
| 50
| 7 January
| @ 
| 6-3
| C. Anderson
| R. Niit
| T. Van Steensel
| 23-22
| 
|-bgcolor=#ffbbbb 
| 51
| 8 January
| @ 
| 8-13
| J. Jarvis
| W. Lundgren
| -
| 23-23
| 
|-bgcolor=#ffbbbb
| 52
| 9 January
| @ 
| 7-8
| R. Searle
| A. Sookee
| -
| 23-24
| 
|-bgcolor=#ffbbbb
| 53
| 10 January
| @ 
| 4-10
| J. Erasmus
| J. Stoecklin
| T. Stanton
| 23-25
| 
|-bgcolor=#bbbbbb
| 54
| 14 January
| @ 
| PPD - RAIN
| -
| -
| -
| -
| 
|-bgcolor=#ffbbbb
| 55
| 15 January
| @ 
| 2-3
| B. Grening
| B. Zywicki
| M. Click
| 23-26
| 
|-bgcolor=#bbffbb
| 56
| 16 January
| @  (DH 1)
| 2-0
| L. Wells
| S. Kent
| T. Van Steensel
| 24-26
| 
|-bgcolor=#ffbbbb
| 57
| 16 January
| @  (DH 2)
| 4-7
| L. Cohen
| W. Lundgren
| M. Click
| 24-27
| 
|-bgcolor=#ffbbbb
| 58
| 17 January
| @ 
| 0-5
| S. Cone
| J. Stoecklin
| -
| 24-28
| 
|-bgcolor=#bbbbbb
| 59
| 21 January
| 
| PPD - RAIN
| -
| -
| -
| -
| 
|-bgcolor=#bbbbbb
| 60
| 22 January
| 
| PPD - RAIN
| -
| -
| -
| -
| 
|-bgcolor=#ffbbbb
| 61
| 23 January
|  (DH 1)
| 3-6
| S. Street
| C. Anderson
| -
| 24-29
| 
|-bgcolor=#bbffbb
| 62
| 23 January
|  (DH 2)
| 4-2
| V. Harris
| M. Larkins
| T. Van Steensel
| 25-29
| 
|-bgcolor=#bbffbb
| 63
| 24 January
| 
| 10-8
| A. Sookee
| T. Marks
| T. Van Steensel
| 26-29
| 
|-

Roster

References 

Sydney Blue Sox
Sydney Blue Sox